Hidajet Hankić (born 29 June 1994) is an Austrian professional footballer who plays as a goalkeeper for Bulgarian First League side Botev Plovdiv.

Club career
He made his Czech First League debut for FK Mladá Boleslav on 25 May 2014 in a game against AC Sparta Prague.

On 2 July 2019 he signed a contract with Romanian Liga I club FC Botoșani.

On 19 July 2021, Hankić was presented as a new player of Bulgarian First League side Botev Plovdiv.

References

External links
 

1994 births
Living people
People from St. Johann im Pongau District
Austrian people of Bosnia and Herzegovina descent
Austrian footballers
Association football goalkeepers
Czech First League players
FK Mladá Boleslav players
2. Liga (Austria) players
SV Austria Salzburg players
FC Blau-Weiß Linz players
FC Wacker Innsbruck (2002) players
Liga I players
FC Botoșani players
Botev Plovdiv players
Austrian expatriate footballers
Austrian expatriate sportspeople in the Czech Republic
Expatriate footballers in the Czech Republic
Austrian expatriate sportspeople in Romania
Expatriate footballers in Romania
Footballers from Salzburg (state)
Austrian expatriate sportspeople in Bulgaria
Expatriate footballers in Bulgaria